Houseknecht Farm is a historic house and farm located at Moreland Township, Lycoming County, Pennsylvania.  The historic buildings are the farmhouse (c. 1890), three-gabled barn (c. 1890, with later additions), three-bay machine / corn shed (late 19th century); granary (late 19th century) with small attached garage (c. 1915); small machine shed (c. 1915); smokehouse (c. 1890); and summer kitchen / butcher house (c. 1890) with attached woodshed.  The farmhouse is a two-story, four-bay, two-door house with a two-story ell.

It was added to the National Register of Historic Places in 2007.

References

Farms on the National Register of Historic Places in Pennsylvania
Houses completed in 1890
Houses in Lycoming County, Pennsylvania
National Register of Historic Places in Lycoming County, Pennsylvania